Westfield is a town in Union County, in the U.S. state of New Jersey, located  southwest of Manhattan. As of the 2020 United States census, the town's population was 31,032, an increase of 716 (+2.4%) from the 2010 census count of 30,316, which in turn reflected an increase of 672 (+2.3%) from the 29,644 counted in the 2000 census.

In March 2018, Bloomberg ranked Westfield as the 99th highest-income place in the United States, and the 18th highest-income location in New Jersey. According to a 2014 nationwide survey, Westfield was ranked as the 30th-safest city to live in the United States.

The town has been one of the state's highest-income communities. Based on data from the American Community Survey for 2013–2017, Westfield residents had a median household income of $159,923, ranked 8th in the state among municipalities with more than 10,000 residents, more than double the statewide median of $76,475.

History

History says that Westfield took its name from the rich "fields west of Elizabeth Town, and hence for over one hundred years went by the name of West Fields." Town records say that "the settlement of Westfield dates back to the last year (1699) of the seventeenth century. It was the result of the 'Clinker Lot Division.' Almost immediately after the division emigration from the older parts of the town of Elizabeth began to set towards the interior,—especially to the territory lying between the Rahway river, on the east, and the mountains, on the west. It was not, however, until 1720 that the settlers became numerous enough to constitute a distinct community."
The old village area, now the downtown district, was settled in 1720 as part of the Elizabethtown Tract.

Westfield was originally formed as a township on January 27, 1794, from portions of Elizabeth Township, while the area was still part of Essex County, and was incorporated on February 21, 1798, as one of New Jersey's initial group of 104 townships by an act of the New Jersey Legislature. It became part of the newly formed Union County on March 19, 1857. Portions of the township have been taken to form Rahway Township (February 27, 1804), Plainfield Township (April 5, 1847), Cranford Township (March 14, 1871), Fanwood Township (March 6, 1878; now known as Scotch Plains) and Mountainside (September 25, 1895). The Town of Westfield was incorporated on March 4, 1903, replacing Westfield Township. The name of the town is derived from its location in the western, undeveloped fields of the Elizabethtown tract.

As recently as 2017, the Broaddus family living in Westfield received threatening letters from a supposed stalker who referred to himself as "The Watcher," causing a national sensation. The Broaddus family's experience, along with the 1971 John List family murders that also occurred in Westfield, were later adapted into the 2022 Netflix series The Watcher.

Geography
According to the United States Census Bureau, the town had a total area of 6.74 square miles (17.46 km2), including 6.72 square miles (17.42 km2) of land and 0.02 square miles (0.05 km2) of water (0.28%).

Unincorporated communities, localities and place names located partially or completely within the township include Germantown and Tamaques Reservation Mill.

Six municipalities border the town of Westfield: Mountainside to the north, Springfield Township to the northeast, Garwood and Cranford to the east, Clark to the southeast, and Scotch Plains to the west and southwest.

The upper reaches of the Rahway River Parkway run through the township along tributaries of the Rahway River.

The Robinson's Branch of the Rahway River additionally flows through the southern portion of Westfield en route to the Robinson's Branch Reservoir, also known as the Clark Reservoir.

It is located about one hour from Manhattan.

Community

Library 
The Westfield Memorial Library was founded in 1873 as the "Every Saturday Book Club" and has evolved over the past century into the Westfield Memorial Library of today.  The Library is located in a large, modern, Williamsburg-style building at 550 East Broad Street.  The library's collection consists of over 250,000 books, two dozen public computers, a wide array of multimedia options, a large youth services area with a vivid mural depicting Westfield history, and multiple tables and carrels for studying.  The library offers classes for adults and children, storytimes for children, and computer instruction.

Downtown 
Westfield's downtown features many local and national stores and several landmarks that were shown and used in the NBC network television show Ed such as the Rialto Theater. There are over 40 restaurants and casual dining establishments throughout the downtown. Downtown is located mostly north of the Westfield train station. The downtown area has a mix of independent stores and boutiques as well as national stores. Over one-third of the retailers and restaurants have existed for 25 years or more.

Downtown Westfield, with over 200 retail establishments and 400 commercial enterprises, is a regional destination in New Jersey. The Downtown Westfield Corporation (DWC) manages the Special Improvement District (SID) area's growth and enhancement. The DWC participates in the National Main Street program associated with the National Trust for Historic Preservation. It is funded by a SID assessment on downtown properties and operates as the district's management agency. The DWC sponsors marketing efforts and promotions, special event planning, urban design and building improvement projects. The DWC works closely with the town government and volunteer groups to improve the downtown area. In 2004, Westfield won the Great American Main Street Award from the National Trust. In 2010, Westfield was the winner of the America in Bloom contest for communities with a population of 25,001–50,000 against the other two towns entered in their category. Shopping and dining in Westfield attracts citizens from other communities across the state.

Several war memorials (including ones dedicated to the Korean War, World War II, Spanish–American War, and the Vietnam War) are located in a plaza near the downtown. The plaza is also home to the September 11 Memorial Park, which pays special tribute to the residents of Westfield who died in the September 11 terrorist attacks.

Downtown Westfield hosts events and festivals throughout the year. Throughout the summer, jazz groups perform live, outdoors, every Tuesday night. October 2018 saw the first annual AddamsFest, honoring Westfield resident Charles Addams. The festival featured exhibits, lectures, film screenings, and a masquerade ball, among other things. Other festivals include the Spring Fling and FestiFall.

In August 2020, Le Tote announced that Lord & Taylor, the town's only department store and the chain's only freestanding location in New Jersey, would close as part of a plan to shut down 38 Lord & Taylor store nationwide. Efforts are being made to redevelop the site.

Parks and recreation

Parks in the town include:
Brightwood Park
Gumbert Park
Lenape Park, is a  wildlife reserve and park that is part of Union County's Rahway River Parkway. The park also includes portions of Cranford, Kenilworth and Springfield Township. An approximately 4.5-mile off-road paved pedestrian path stretches eastbound from Mountainside Police Headquarters in Mountainside,  through Echo Lake Park in Westfield, Lenape Park in Westfield and Cranford, Black Brook Park in Kenilworth, and ending near 505 North Michigan Avenue in Kenilworth. 
Mindowaskin Park
Tamaques Park
Gary Kehler Stadium is named in honor of Gary Kehler (1931–2007), the former Westfield High School football coach and long-time town resident.

Demographics

2010 census

The Census Bureau's 2006–2010 American Community Survey showed that (in 2010 inflation-adjusted dollars) median household income was $127,799 (with a margin of error of +/− $10,580) and the median family income was $150,797 (+/− $11,480). Males had a median income of $111,762 (+/− $7,767) versus $71,217 (+/− $5,624) for females. The per capita income for the town was $63,498 (+/− $4,577). About 0.9% of families and 2.3% of the population were below the poverty line, including 2.4% of those under age 18 and 2.0% of those age 65 or over.

2000 census
As of the 2000 United States census there were 29,644 people, 10,622 households, and 8,178 families residing in the town.  The population density was 4,403.1 people per square mile (1,700.7/km2).  There were 10,819 housing units at an average density of 1,607.0 per square mile (620.7/km2).  The racial makeup of the town was 89.98% White, 3.88% African American, 0.09% Native American, 4.08% Asian, 0.01% Pacific Islander, 0.62% from other races, and 1.33% from two or more races. Hispanic or Latino of any race were 2.82% of the population.

There were 10,622 households, out of which 40.8% had children under the age of 18 living with them, 68.0% were married couples living together, 7.1% had a female householder with no husband present, and 23.0% were non-families. Of all households, 19.3% were made up of individuals, and 9.4% had someone living alone who was 65 years of age or older. The average household size was 2.77 and the average family size was 3.20.

In the town, the population was spread out, with 28.4% under the age of 18, 4.0% from 18 to 24, 29.6% from 25 to 44, 24.5% from 45 to 64, and 13.5% who were 65 years of age or older. The median age was 39 years. For every 100 females, there were 92.1 males.  For every 100 females age 18 and over, there were 87.4 males.

The median income for a household in the town was $98,390, and the median income for a family was $112,145. Males had a median income of $82,420 versus $45,305 for females. The per capita income for the town was $47,187.  About 1.7% of families and 2.7% of the population were below the poverty line, including 3.3% of those under age 18 and 3.1% of those age 65 or over.

Government

Local government 
Westfield is governed under a Special Charter granted by an act of the New Jersey Legislature. The town is one of 11 municipalities (of the 564) statewide that operate under special charters. The governing body is comprised of a Mayor and an eight-member Town Council, with all positions filled in partisan elections. The Mayor is elected directly by the voters at-large to a four-year term of office. The Town Council consists of eight members, with two members elected from each of four wards. Town Council members are elected to serve four-year terms on a staggered basis, with one seat in each ward coming up for election every other year. The Town Council holds meetings every two weeks where it discusses legislation under consideration, and which are open to the public.

, the Mayor of Westfield is Democrat Michelle W. "Shelley" Brindle, whose term of office ends on December 31, 2025. Members of the Westfield Town Council are David M. Contract (Ward 3; D, 2025), Michael J. Dardia (Ward 2; D, 2025), Linda S. Habgood (Ward 1; D, 2025), Scott A. Katz (Ward 4; D, 2023), Mark LoGrippo (Ward 3; Republican, 2023), Dawn Mackey (Ward 4; D, 2025), Mark Parmelee (Ward 2; D, 2023) and Emily Root (Ward 1; D, 2023 - appointed to serve an unexpired term),.

In April 2022, the Town Council selected Emily Root from a list of three alternatives submitted by the Democratic municipal committee to fill the Ward 1 seat expiring on December 2023 that had been held by James Boyes until he resigned from office earlier that month. Root will serve on an interim basis until the November 2022 general election, when voters will select a candidate to serve the balance of the term of office.

Emergency services

Police 
The Westfield Police Department (WPD) has provided police protection to the town since 1903. The chief of police is Christopher Battiloro, who was appointed to the position in December 2018, after serving for four months on an interim basis. The department operates a Patrol Division, Traffic Safety Bureau, Records Bureau, Detective Bureau and its own Emergency Services Unit.  Westfield's Parking Services also falls under the jurisdiction of the WPD, and is responsible for monitoring parking and traffic safety within Westfield's Central Business District and near schools. The WPD also has a Law Enforcement Explorers Post, Post #90. Each division of the WPD operates different vehicles, most with a black-and-white paint scheme.

Fire 
The Westfield Fire Department was formed in 1875 following a fire that destroyed a city block on East Broad Street. The WFD is a combination department with 36 paid/career firefighters and 15 volunteer firefighters. There are four platoons of eight (a Battalion Chief, two Lieutenants and five Firefighters) working a 24-/72-hour work schedule out of two fire stations. Administrative members include the Chief of Department, the Deputy Chief of Operations, and the Deputy Chief of Fire Prevention. The Fire Safety Inspector position in the Fire Prevention Bureau was eliminated in January 2009 due to budget cuts. The Chief of Department is Anthony Tiller.

Westfield Fire Headquarters, located at 405 North Avenue West, is staffed 24 hours a day by a Battalion Chief (Shift Commander), a lieutenant and three firefighters. These personnel make up the engine company, first due on the north side of town, and the ladder company. A reserve engine company and a utility pick-up are also housed at fire headquarters. The office of the Chief of Department and the Deputy Chief of Operations are located here as well.

Station 2, located at 1029 Central Avenue, is staffed 24 hours a day by a lieutenant and two firefighters. These personnel make up the engine company, first due on the south side of town. A reserve engine company, a utility pick-up, and a spare SUV are also housed at Station 2. The Fire Prevention Bureau is located at Station 2 and houses the office of the Deputy Chief of Fire Prevention.

The WFD in operates a fleet of four E-One Engines (2 x 2,000 GPM & 2 x 1,500 GPM) and 1 Pierce Arrow XT 100' Rearmount Ladder, one support SUV, and three staff 4x4 vehicles. The paint scheme for the older apparatus (Engine 4) is yellow, with the newer apparatus (Ladder 1, Engines 2, 3 & 5) being red bodies with white cabs. The support vehicles, a Ford Pick-Up (Utility 7), a Chevy Pick-Up (Utility 8), and a Jeep Cherokee (Car 9) are red with white striping and the remaining staff vehicles, for Chief Officers, are unmarked Dodge Durangos (Car 1,11,12).

The WFD responds annually to approximately 2,000 calls for service. The WFD serves as a backup EMS agency for the town if the Westfield Volunteer Rescue Squad is not readily available. All members are CPR-Defib certified with 27 members currently New Jersey certified EMTs with the remaining members trained to the first responder level. Both stations are staffed with FF/EMTs 24 hours a day.

The WFD is also a partner in the Union County Fire Mutual Aid agreement, responding to numerous requests for aid to any of the other 20 municipalities in Union County.

The career firefighters (excluding the Chief and Deputy Chiefs) are members of New Jersey Firefighter's Mutual Benevolent Association (NJ FMBA) Local 30.

Rescue squad 
The Westfield Volunteer Rescue Squad is staffed around the clock by volunteer certified EMTs.  Shifts range from 5 hours in the morning and afternoon to 14 hours overnight.  The Squad has three ambulances with a crew every shift.  Members are paged in the event that another emergency arises and the original crew is answering a medical call.  Dispatchers are also volunteers, answering phones directly from the police line.

Federal, state and county representation 
Westfield is located in the 7th Congressional District and is part of New Jersey's 21st state legislative district.

 

Union County is governed by a Board of County Commissioners, whose nine members are elected at-large to three-year terms of office on a staggered basis with three seats coming up for election each year, with an appointed County Manager overseeing the day-to-day operations of the county. At an annual reorganization meeting held in the beginning of January, the board selects a Chair and Vice Chair from among its members. , Union County's County Commissioners are 
Chair Rebecca Williams (D, Plainfield, term as commissioner and as chair ends December 31, 2022), 
Vice Chair Christopher Hudak (D, Linden, term as commissioner ends 2023; term as vice chair ends 2022),
James E. Baker Jr. (D, Rahway, 2024),
Angela R. Garretson (D, Hillside, 2023),
Sergio Granados (D, Elizabeth, 2022),
Bette Jane Kowalski (D, Cranford, 2022), 
Lourdes M. Leon (D, Elizabeth, 2023),
Alexander Mirabella (D, Fanwood, 2024) and 
Kimberly Palmieri-Mouded (D, Westfield, 2024).
Constitutional officers elected on a countywide basis are
County Clerk Joanne Rajoppi (D, Union Township, 2025),
Sheriff Peter Corvelli (D, Kenilworth, 2023) and
Surrogate Susan Dinardo (acting).
The County Manager is Edward Oatman.

Politics

As of March 2011, there were a total of 20,684 registered voters in Westfield, of which 6,485 (31.4% vs. 41.8% countywide) were registered as Democrats, 5,244 (25.4% vs. 15.3%) were registered as Republicans and 8,942 (43.2% vs. 42.9%) were registered as Unaffiliated. There were 13 voters registered as Libertarians or Greens. Among the town's 2010 Census population, 68.2% (vs. 53.3% in Union County) were registered to vote, including 97.5% of those ages 18 and over (vs. 70.6% countywide).

In the 2012 presidential election, Democrat Barack Obama received 8,080 votes (50.9% vs. 66.0% countywide), ahead of Republican Mitt Romney with 7,555 votes (47.6% vs. 32.3%) and other candidates with 147 votes (0.9% vs. 0.8%), among the 15,866 ballots cast by the town's 21,797 registered voters, for a turnout of 72.8% (vs. 68.8% in Union County). In the 2008 presidential election, Democrat Barack Obama received 9,345 votes (54.5% vs. 63.1% countywide), ahead of Republican John McCain with 7,541 votes (44.0% vs. 35.2%) and other candidates with 154 votes (0.9% vs. 0.9%), among the 17,141 ballots cast by the town's 21,251 registered voters, for a turnout of 80.7% (vs. 74.7% in Union County). In the 2004 presidential election, Democrat John Kerry received 8,442 votes (50.6% vs. 58.3% countywide), ahead of Republican George W. Bush with 8,037 votes (48.2% vs. 40.3%) and other candidates with 110 votes (0.7% vs. 0.7%), among the 16,683 ballots cast by the town's 20,441 registered voters, for a turnout of 81.6% (vs. 72.3% in the whole county).

In the 2013 gubernatorial election, Republican Chris Christie received 64.1% of the vote (6,303 cast), ahead of Democrat Barbara Buono with 34.5% (3,394 votes), and other candidates with 1.3% (131 votes), among the 10,053 ballots cast by the town's 21,513 registered voters (225 ballots were spoiled), for a turnout of 46.7%. In the 2009 gubernatorial election, Republican Chris Christie received 6,070 votes (51.0% vs. 41.7% countywide), ahead of Democrat Jon Corzine with 4,776 votes (40.2% vs. 50.6%), Independent Chris Daggett with 900 votes (7.6% vs. 5.9%) and other candidates with 58 votes (0.5% vs. 0.8%), among the 11,893 ballots cast by the town's 20,982 registered voters, yielding a 56.7% turnout (vs. 46.5% in the county).

Education 
Public school students in pre-kindergarten through twelfth grades attend the Westfield Public Schools. As of the 2018–19 school year, the district, comprised of 10 schools, had an enrollment of 6,304 students and 500.4 classroom teachers (on an FTE basis), for a student–teacher ratio of 12.6:1. The district has a central kindergarten, six neighborhood elementary schools (grades 1–5), two middle schools (grades 6–8) divided by a "North Side / South Side" boundary, and one high school (grades 9–12). The schools in the district (with 2018–19 enrollment data from the National Center for Education Statistics) are 
Lincoln Early Childhood Center (with 310 students; in grades Pre-K–K), 
Franklin Elementary School (580; 1–5 – North), 
Jefferson Elementary School (442; 1–5 – South), 
McKinley Elementary School (341; 1–5 – South), 
Tamaques Elementary School (401; 1–5 – South), 
Washington Elementary School (309; 1–5 – North), 
Wilson Elementary School (355; 1–5 – North), 
Roosevelt Intermediate School (777; 6–8 – North), 
Thomas Alva Edison Intermediate School (844; 6–8 – South) and 
Westfield High School (1,865; 9–12).

For high school, public school students from Westfield and all of Union County are eligible to apply to attend the Union County Vocational Technical Schools, which include Union County Magnet High School, Union County Academy for Information Technology, Union County Academy for Allied Health Sciences, Union County Vocational Technical High School and Union County Academy for Performing Arts.

Holy Trinity Interparochial School is a Middle States-accredited Catholic school run by the three parishes of Holy Trinity and St. Helen's in Westfield along with Our Lady of Lourdes in Mountainside, which offers education from pre-kindergarten to 8th grade and operates under the auspices of the Roman Catholic Archdiocese of Newark.

Transportation

Roads and highways

The main road serving Westfield is Route 28, which runs for about two miles alongside the commuter railroad that marks the boundary between the town's North and South Sides. Westfield can also be accessed by Exits 135 and 137 of the nearby Garden State Parkway, or by the Lawrence, Mountain, or Springfield Avenue exits of U.S. Route 22.

Public transportation

NJ Transit (NJT) provides passenger rail service from the Westfield train station on the Raritan Valley Line to Newark Penn Station with connecting service to New York Penn Station. Westfield riders are able to make a one-seat ride (no transfer necessary) into NY Penn Station during weekday off-peak hours, which was made possible by upgrades of the NJT train equipment to operate into New York City. Westfield's position and schedule on the Raritan Valley Line make it desirable for commuters, as several times in the morning and evening rush hours a non-stop service operates to/from Newark Penn Station.  On these non-stop services, the one-way journey time to/from NY Penn Station is 50 minutes, or 20 minutes to/from Newark Penn Station. This easy access to New York is what draws so many people to the town of Westfield.

The NJT 113 bus route provides one-seat service to New York City's Port Authority Bus Terminal seven days per week from the town center, taking approximately one hour to NYC, with additional service available along Route 22 on the northern edge of the town (NJT bus routes 114 and 117), taking approximately 45 minutes. The 59 route provides local bus service between Plainfield and Newark.

Newark Liberty International Airport is approximately 20 minutes away, most conveniently reached via Route 22 or NJT trains. Linden Airport, a general aviation facility, is in nearby Linden, New Jersey.

Services 
Residential telephone service is provided by Verizon Communications. Westfield cable television is supplied by Comcast , which also delivers Westfield Community Television (channel 36), News 12 New Jersey (channel 62), and Scotch Plains Local Access Channel (channel 34) Verizon FiOS is also offered in Westfield, which gives the option of digital cable, high-speed internet and telephone service. Power is supplied through the Public Service Electric and Gas Company. Gas is supplied by Elizabethtown Gas and water by American Water of New Jersey.  Recycling is collected curbside by private haulers contracted by the Department of Public Works on a biweekly basis, while trash is collected by private haulers hired by residents.

Media
Westfield is served by the locally published weekly newspaper, The Westfield Leader. The Record-Press had served the community until it ended publication in 2008. Westfield is also served by multi-community newspapers including the Courier News, a daily newspaper based in Bridgewater Township, and The Star-Ledger based in Newark. Westfield Patch is an online news source dedicated strictly to local Westfield news that is updated around the clock by a small staff of paid editors and volunteer contributors. Likewise, TAPInto Westfield is an online news source dedicated to local Westfield news.

Westfield Community Television (WCT)
The local community access channel 36 operates out of the Municipal Building on Broad Street in Westfield on Mondays, Wednesdays, Fridays and half of every Sunday. WCT provides limited community-related programming, coverage of town council meetings, and operates the WCT Bulletin Board. WCT shares time on channel 36 with Blue Devil Television, which originates from Westfield High School and produces nearly 200 original productions each academic year.

Culture
The Greek Orthodox Archdiocese of America Metropolis of New Jersey is headquartered in Westfield.

Notable people

People who were born in, residents of, or otherwise closely associated with Westfield include:

 Marc Acito (born 1966), playwright, novelist and humorist
 Charles Addams (1912–1988), cartoonist for The New Yorker magazine, most famous for his cartoons of The Addams Family
 Kim Alsop (born ), former head coach of the Samford Bulldogs football team
 Charles E. Apgar (1865–1950), business executive and amateur radio operator best known for making early recordings of German radio transmissions at the start of World War I
 Virginia Apgar (1909–1974), creator of the Apgar score for assessing health of newborns
 Billy Ard (born 1959), former NFL guard for the New York Giants and Green Bay Packers
 H. W. Ambruster (1879–1961), football coach, chemical engineer, actor and lecturer
 Omar Ashmawy, staff director and chief counsel of the Office of Congressional Ethics
 Richard Bagger (born 1960), former mayor, who served as chief of staff for Governor of New Jersey Chris Christie
 Robert L. Barchi (born 1946), twentieth president of Rutgers University, 2012-2020
 Cheryl Barnes, singer and actress best known for her role in Miloš Forman's 1979 film adaptation of Hair, where she played the mother of Hud's little son
 Carolyn Beebe (1873–1950), pianist who was a founder of the New York Chamber Music Society
 Bryan Beller (born 1971), bass guitarist known for his work with Mike Keneally, Steve Vai, Dethklok, James LaBrie of Dream Theater and Dweezil Zappa
 Jon Bramnick (born 1953), member of the New Jersey General Assembly who has represented the 21st Legislative District since 2003
 Brock Brower (1931–2014), novelist, magazine journalist and TV writer
 Dave Brown (born 1970), NFL quarterback who played for the New York Giants and Arizona Cardinals
 Steve Brozak (born 1961), Managing Partner and President of WBB Securities, LLC, a Democratic congressional candidate in the 2004 election cycle and the Chairman and CEO of StormBio, Inc.
 Robert N. Buck (1914–2007), aviator and author who broke 14 junior airspeed records in the 1930s, started his flying career at the Westfield Airport
 Alan Bunce (1900–1965), radio and television actor
 Devin Caherly (born 2001, class of 2019), social media personality
 Chris Campbell (born 1954), wrestler who won a bronze medalist in Freestyle wrestling at the 1992 Summer Olympics
 Gil Chapman (born 1953), running back and return specialist for the University of Michigan and New Orleans Saints
 Steve Cheek (born 1977), NFL punter, 2001–2005 (San Francisco 49ers, Kansas City Chiefs, Carolina Panthers)
 Michael Chertoff (born 1953), United States Secretary of Homeland Security and former United States district court Judge
 John Chironna (1928–2010), head coach of the Rhode Island Rams football team in 1961 and 1962
 Chris Christie (born 1962), Governor of New Jersey, who lived in Westfield for a year while his home in Mendham was under construction
 Bob Clotworthy (1931–2018), diver who competed in the 3 m springboard at the 1952 and 1956 Olympics and won a bronze and a gold medal, respectively
 Grover Connell (1918–2018), rice trader and longtime member of the Forbes 400
 Pat Cosquer (born 1975), college squash coach
 John Cuneo (born 1957), illustrator, whose work has appeared in The New Yorker, Esquire, Sports Illustrated and The Atlantic
 Nicholas Delpopolo (born 1989), judoka who has represented the United States at the 2012 Summer Olympics and 2016 Summer Olympics
 Robert S. Dietz (1914–1995), marine geologist, geophysicist and oceanographer who conducted pioneering research concerning seafloor spreading
 Alexander Wilson Drake (1843–1916), artist, collector and critic
 Sara Driver (born 1955), independent filmmaker
 Michael DuHaime (born 1974), Republican strategist and public affairs executive
 Geoff Edwards (1931–2014), actor and game show host
 Edward Einhorn (born 1970), children's author, director and playwright
 Mike Emanuel (born 1967), Washington correspondent for Fox News
 Gail Falkenberg (born 1947), professional tennis player, who may be the oldest tournament tennis player of all time, having competed in ITF Women's World Tennis Tour tournaments as recently as 2021, at age 74
 Thomas Farley, pediatrician who served as the commissioner of the Philadelphia Department of Health
 Kevin Feige (born 1973), film producer and President of Marvel Studios
 Michael Fennelly (born 1949), rock guitarist, singer and songwriter who performed with The Millennium and Crabby Appleton
 Gerald Foster (1900–1987), painter who competed in the painting event in the art competition at the 1932 Summer Olympics
 William Chapman Foster (1897–1984), businessman and high-ranking government official who negotiated multiple arms control treaties
 Nona Garson (born 1958), equestrian who competed in team jumping and individual jumping at the 2000 Summer Olympics in Sydney
 GH057ayame (gamer tag of Eric Hewitt), retired professional Major League Gaming gamer who works for 343 Industries working on future Halo games
 Gina Glantz (born ), political strategist, campaign manager, field director and consultant
 John Duval Gluck (1878–1951), philanthropist, customs broker and con artist who is best known for popularizing the practice of sending and answering letters to Santa Claus in New York City
 Dan Graham (born 1942), artist, writer, and curator
 Joseph Greenspan (born 1992), soccer player for the Pittsburgh Riverhounds SC of the United Soccer League
 Robert Greifeld (born 1957), CEO of NASDAQ-OMX
 Matt Gutman (born 1977), ABC News correspondent
 Harry Hanan (1916–1982), cartoonist of the syndicated comic strip Louie
 Kenneth Hand (1899–1988), politician and judge who served in the New Jersey Senate
 Walt Hansgen (1919–1966), race car driver
 Chuck Hardwick (born 1941), politician and business leader who served as Speaker of the New Jersey General Assembly and was a candidate for Governor of New Jersey
 Langston Hughes (1902–1967), poet
 Clark Hulings (1922–2011), realist artist
 Zora Neale Hurston (1891–1960), folklorist
 Scott Jacobs (born 1958), painter known for his photorealistic work of Harley-Davidson motorcycles, who became the company's first official licensed artist in 1993
 Robert Kaplow (born 1954), teacher and novelist whose coming-of-age novel was made into a film titled Me and Orson Welles
 Thomas Kean Jr. (born 1968), New Jersey State Senator and son of former Governor of New Jersey Thomas Kean
 Mary Jo Keenen, actress who appeared on Nurses
 Kevin Kelly (born 1952), founder of Wired magazine
 Robert Kirsch (born 1966), state court judge from New Jersey who is a nominee to serve as a United States district judge of the United States District Court for the District of New Jersey.
 Martin Kunert (born 1970), film director and TV writer/producer of Voices of Iraq, MTV's Fear and Campfire Tales
 Christian J. Lambertsen (1917–2011), "the father of the Frogmen"
 Marilyn Lange (born 1952), Playboy Playmate for May 1974 and Playmate of the Year for 1975
 Margaret Carver Leighton (1896–1987), children's author
 Ira Lewis (1932–2015), actor and playwright, whose works included Chinese Coffee
 John List (1925–2008), murderer convicted in the deaths of his wife, mother and three children. Known as the "Boogeyman of Westfield"
 Matt Loughlin, sportscaster who is the radio play-by-play voice of the New Jersey Devils of the National Hockey League on WFAN
 Andrew McCarthy (born 1962), actor who appeared in Weekend at Bernie's and is currently starring in The Family
 Sy Montgomery (born 1958), naturalist, author and scriptwriter
 Patrick Morrisey (born 1967), elected as Attorney General of West Virginia in 2012
 Rebecca Morse (born 1992), ice hockey defender, currently playing for the Metropolitan Riveters of the National Women's Hockey League
 Laura Overdeck, entrepreneur and philanthropist who is the founder and president of Bedtime Math
 Bill Palatucci (born 1958), attorney who is a member of the Republican National Committee and the New Jersey Apportionment Commission, and led the selection of staff for the presidential transition of Donald Trump
 John S. Penn (1926–2013), politician who represented the 16th Legislative District in the New Jersey General Assembly from 1984 to 1994
 Randolph Perkins (1871–1936), mayor of Westfield from 1903 to 1905, and represented New Jersey's 6th congressional district from 1921 to 1936
 Dave Perkowski (born 1947), former competition swimmer who represented the United States in the 100-meter breaststroke event at the 1968 Summer Olympics in Mexico City
 Arthur N. Pierson (1867–1957), businessman and politician who served as Speaker of the New Jersey General Assembly and President of the New Jersey Senate
 Paul Robeson (1898–1976), athlete, actor, singer, political activist, NFL guard from 1920 to 1922 for the Akron Pros and Milwaukee Badgers
 Andrew K. Ruotolo (1952–1995), politician who served as the Union County, New Jersey, prosecutor
 John Rzeznik (born 1965), lead singer of the Goo Goo Dolls
 Bret Schundler (born 1959), former Mayor of Jersey City and former New Jersey gubernatorial candidate
 Amos Scudder (1779–1856), architect and builder
 Ephraim Scudder (1819–1872), builder
 John Scudder (1815–1869), builder
 Coleen Sexton (born 1979), actress who made her Broadway debut at age 20 in Jekyll & Hyde in 2000
 Matthew Sklar (born 1973), Tony Award and Emmy Award-nominated composer of Broadway musicals The Prom, Elf the Musical, and The Wedding Singer
 Jessica St. Clair (born 1976), actress and improvisational comedian
 Dan Soucek (born 1969), North Carolina State Senator
 Jeff Torborg (born 1941), MLB player and manager
 P. Roy Vagelos (born 1929), former Chairman and CEO of Merck & Co.
 Jeffrey A. Warsh (born 1960), former member of the New Jersey General Assembly and Executive Director of NJ Transit
 Dave Weinstein (born 1988), appointed by Governor of New Jersey Chris Christie in 2016 to serve as the state's Chief Technology Officer
 Roger Welch (born 1946), conceptual artist
 Harrison A. Williams (1919–2001), U.S. Senator who was forced to resign in the face of expulsion due to his involvement in the Abscam case
 Malinda Williams (born 1975), actress
 Alfred M. Wolin (born 1932), former United States district judge of the United States District Court for the District of New Jersey.
 Glen Everett Woolfenden (1930–2007), ornithologist, known for his long-term study of the Florida scrub jay population at Archbold Biological Station near Lake Placid, Florida
 Harold "Butch" Woolfolk (born 1960), NFL running back from 1982 to 1988 who played for the New York Giants, Houston Oilers and Detroit Lions
 Dan Yemin, punk rock guitarist

References

External links

Westfield Area Chamber of Commerce

 
1798 establishments in New Jersey
Populated places established in 1798
Special Charters in New Jersey
Towns in Union County, New Jersey